Mohammed Salem Saleh Al Saadi (born 28 October 1982) is an Emirati footballer who plays as a midfielder . Previously, he was captain of Al Dhafra SCC.

References

External links
 Al Ain official profile
 

1982 births
Living people
People from Abu Dhabi
Association football midfielders
Al Dhafra FC players
Al Ain FC players
Al-Shaab CSC players
Ajman Club players
Emirati footballers
UAE First Division League players
UAE Pro League players